Emily Hewson (born 31 July 1982) is a retired Australian tennis player.

Her highest WTA singles ranking is 314, which she reached on 23 July 2007. Her career-high in doubles is 204, which she achieved on 25 February 2008.

In her career, Hewson won two singles and four doubles titles on the ITF Circuit.

ITF Circuit finals

Singles 5 (2 titles, 3 runner-ups)

Doubles 11 (4 titles, 7 runner-ups)

External links
 
 
 
 
 Emily Hewson Photos at WTA96.com

1982 births
Living people
Australian female tennis players
Sportswomen from New South Wales
Tennis players from Sydney